Situated in the Ódáðahraun lava field, Trölladyngja is the biggest of the Icelandic shield volcanoes, reaching a height of  above sea level, and rising almost 600 metres above the surrounding desert and lava fields.

It is about 10 kilometres in diameter and its inclination is 4 to 5° in the lower slopes, but 6 to 8° at higher elevations. Its oblong crater is about 1,200 to 1,500 metres in length, 500 metres broad, and about 100 metres deep.

Most of its lava fields have flowed in a northerly direction, with one branch of it reaching the valley of Bárðardalur, a distance of roughly 100 km.

Reports of an eruption in 1961 at Trölladyngja are most likely attributed to nearby Askja Caldera, which erupted the same year.

References

Mountains of Iceland
Volcanoes of Iceland
Holocene shield volcanoes
Active volcanoes
North Volcanic Zone of Iceland
One-thousanders of Iceland
Shield volcanoes of Iceland